The following is a list of ecoregions in Tanzania, as identified by the Worldwide Fund for Nature (WWF).

Terrestrial ecoregions
by major habitat type

Tropical and subtropical moist broadleaf forests
 Albertine Rift montane forests
 East African montane forests
 Eastern Arc forests
 Northern Zanzibar–Inhambane coastal forest mosaic
 Southern Zanzibar–Inhambane coastal forest mosaic

Tropical and subtropical grasslands, savannas, and shrublands
 Central Zambezian miombo woodlands
 Eastern miombo woodlands
 Itigi–Sumbu thicket
 Northern Acacia–Commiphora bushlands and thickets
 Serengeti volcanic grasslands
 Southern Acacia–Commiphora bushlands and thickets
 Victoria Basin forest–savanna mosaic

Flooded grasslands and savannas
 East African halophytics
 Zambezian flooded grasslands

Montane grasslands and shrublands
 East African montane moorlands
 Southern Rift montane forest–grassland mosaic

Mangroves
 East African mangroves

Freshwater ecoregions
by bioregion

Great Lakes
 Lake Malawi
 Lake Rukwa
 Lake Tanganyika
 Lakes Kivu, Edward, George, and Victoria

Eastern and Coastal
 Eastern Coastal Basins
 Malagarasi-Moyowosi
 Pangani
 Southern Eastern Rift

Marine ecoregions
 East African Coral Coast

References
 Burgess, Neil, Jennifer D’Amico Hales, Emma Underwood (2004). Terrestrial Ecoregions of Africa and Madagascar: A Conservation Assessment. Island Press, Washington DC.
 Spalding, Mark D., Helen E. Fox, Gerald R. Allen, Nick Davidson et al. "Marine Ecoregions of the World: A Bioregionalization of Coastal and Shelf Areas". Bioscience Vol. 57 No. 7, July/August 2007, pp. 573-583. 
 Thieme, Michelle L. (2005). Freshwater Ecoregions of Africa and Madagascar: A Conservation Assessment. Island Press, Washington DC.

Ecoregions of Tanzania
Tanzania
Ecoregions